Thomas Alan Johnston is a Scottish engineer.

Johnston was the chief executive of Glasgow-based Babtie Group Ltd. Since the company's acquisition by Jacobs Engineering Group, Inc in 2004, he has continued to work for Jacobs Babtie Group Ltd. In 1995 Johnston was elected Fellow of the Royal Academy of Engineering.

Sources 
Thomas Alan Johnston in Royal Academy of Engineering's Media Database of Fellows

Scottish civil engineers
Fellows of the Royal Academy of Engineering
Year of birth missing (living people)
Living people